There are three species of lizard named Hispaniolan gracile anole:
 Anolis distichus, native to Hispaniola and the Bahamas, and introduced to Florida
 Anolis properus, found in the Dominican Republic
 Anolis ravitergum, found in the Dominican Republic